SAIC-GM-Wuling Automobile (abbreviated as SGMW) is a joint venture between SAIC Motor, General Motors, and Liuzhou Wuling Motors Co Ltd. Based in Liuzhou, Guangxi Zhuang Autonomous Region, in southwestern China, it makes commercial and consumer vehicles sold in China under the Wuling and Baojun marques, respectively. A major mass-volume producer in the Chinese interior, in 2011 SGMW sold 1,286,000 vehicles in China, 1,445,000 in 2012, and aims to sell 2 million cars annually. Its offerings range in price from US$5,000 to US$10,000.
SGMW is one of the largest manufacturers of microvans in China. Known as xiao mianbao che (小面包车), or "small bread box cars," these pint-size commercial vehicles are no larger than a compact car and have sold well in the poorer interior. One of its popular microvans is the Wuling Sunshine. Selling more than 450,000 units per year, SGMW has claimed no one model outsells it in China.

Both SGMW and Liuzhou Wuling Automobile Industry Co. Ltd. use the Wuling brand name and the red, five-diamond "W" logo.

History
While Wuling microvans have been manufactured since 1982, in 1986 Wuling's predecessor company, Liuzhou Automotive Industry Corporation, reached an agreement with Mitsubishi Motors to assemble the L100 type Mitsubishi Minicab. Originally, 90% of parts were imported, but gradually local parts content increased. This small van was sold as the Liuzhou Wuling LZ 110.

In 2002, the joint venture SAIC-GM-Wuling was formed, with SAIC taking 50.1% of the shares, GM 34%, and Wuling Group 15.9%. Wuling transferred the production of microvans and small trucks to the new company. Since at least 2008, GM sought to increase its ownership achieving this aim c. 2011. Its stake rose to 44%—leaving Wuling with 5.9%.

In 2010, SGMW created a passenger car brand to compete against indigenous products, Baojun. The company sold a passenger vehicle, the Chevy Spark / Daewoo Matiz M150, as the Baojun Lechi from 2007 to 2012, however.

In late 2012, ten years after the formation of the joint-venture, SGMW opened a new factory for the production of Baojun passenger cars in Liuzhou, Guangxi Zhuang Autonomous Region, ready to produce 400,000 units per year. A factory with capacity for the same number of power trains is also being built.

Etsong acquisition
Best known for its tiny offerings, in 2005 SGMW acquired diminutive Etsong Vehicle Manufacturing, a small-scale manufacturing concern based in Qingdao, China. The factory was originally set up in 1997 by a Chinese tobacco company and was then briefly owned by the First Automobile Works (FAW Jiefang) before the SAIC group took over the factory. Since 2000, a number of Austin Maestro/Montego amalgams had been produced under the Etsong Lubao and Etsong Lande nameplates, but SGMW did not recommence production of these aged models after the takeover. Instead, the factory is used to augment SGMW mini-vehicle capacity.

Baojun
Perhaps the culmination of GM's dream to build a "farmer's car", the Baojun brand was established in 2010 and aims to sell to consumers in third and fourth tier Chinese cities. Such large- and medium-sized Chinese cities are not counted among the top four in terms of population and contribution to GDP.

Baojun currently competes for consumers with indigenous brands like Chery and Geely. Its two offerings include, as of 2012, the 630, a small four-door sedan, and the Lechi minicar. The latter is an updated version of the first generation Daewoo Matiz and was previously sold under the Chevrolet brand name. During the transition between brands, the Lechi was offered as both a Chevrolet and a Baojun.

Current Products

Baojun 

 E100
 E200 
 Kiwi / E300 
Lechi
310 
360
510
530
560
610 / 630 
730
RC-5
RC-6
RS-3
RS-5
RS-7
RS-5

Notes

Wuling 

Hongguang Mini EV
Nano EV
Air EV
Asta
Bingo
Xingchi
Jiachen
Hongguang 
Hongguang Plus
Zhengcheng
Victory
Zhengtu
Sunshine 
Rongguang 

Notes

Former Products 
 Hongguang
 Dragon / Xingwang 
 LZW6370 
 Hongtu (also N200)
Notes

Operations
The company has a number of production bases in China. These include a facility in Liuzhou, Guangxi, and a plant in Qingdao, which it had purchased c. 2007.

Overseas operation

On August 20, 2015, the company operating as PT SGMW Motor Indonesia (Wuling Motors) laid the first stone of a new manufacturing facility in Cikarang, West Java, Indonesia. The facility spans 600,000 square meters, set aside for the production and manufacture of motor vehicles in Indonesia and to set up an export base for Southeast Asia. The investment of the project is around US$700 million. At peak capacity, the plant is expected to produce up to 150,000 vehicles in a year and estimated to create estimated 3,000 jobs. On July 11, 2017, the facility starts its operations for mass production. The first product under the brand Wuling Motors for Indonesian market is Wuling Hongguang S1, renamed as the Wuling Confero. In 2018, SGMW Indonesia launched Baojun 730 as the Wuling Cortez. In 2019, SGMW Indonesia introduced Baojun 530, renamed as Wuling Almaz as their first SUV.

Production figures

Export
While the majority of SGMW products are sold domestically in China, some export does occur. In 2009, Wuling began to export its small commercial vehicles to South America, the Middle East, and North Africa where they are sold under the Chevrolet brand. The first such vehicles were sent to Peru in July 2009. These exports may constitute CKD knock-down kits with final assembly only done in the receiving nation as is the case in Egypt.

In 2010, GM and SAIC established an equally-owned joint venture which exported SGMW products to India until General Motors stopped selling cars in India at the end of 2017.

Wuling mini-trucks were exported in limited numbers to the United States from 2004 to 2005. SGMW USA, a Cobra Motors company, imported and distributed the vehicles. Those trucks were limited to off-road use (i.e. private property), and were primarily marketed as industrial and commercial vehicles.

See also
 SAIC-GM

References

External links

 
 Introduction from GM China homepage